The 2019 South American Cricket Championship was a cricket tournament that took place in Lima, Peru from 3 to 6 October 2019. This was the second edition of the women's South American Cricket Championship in which matches were eligible for Women's Twenty20 International (WT20I) status, since the ICC granted T20I status to matches between all of its Members. Brazil were the defending champions from the 2018 edition.

The five participating teams were the national sides of Peru, Argentina, Brazil, Chile and Mexico. Brazil retained their title by winning all four of their matches in the round-robin stage and then defeating Argentina by 4 wickets in the final.

Squads

Round-robin stage

Points table

Fixtures

Final

See also
 2019 South American Cricket Championship – Men's tournament

References

External links
 Series home at ESPN Cricinfo

Associate international cricket competitions in 2019–20
International cricket competitions in Peru